Anton Turek (18 January 1919 – 11 May 1984) was a German footballer who played as a goalkeeper.

Career 
Born in Duisburg, Turek started his career at Duisburger Sportverein, but he soon switched to TuS Duisburg 48/99. He first came to the attention of later West Germany national team coach Sepp Herberger was on 27 September 1936, when West Germany played a preparation game against Luxembourg in Krefeld. Before that game, the youth teams of Krefeld and TuS Duisburg 48/99 had met with the 17-year-old Turek standing in the Duisburg goal. During World War II Turek was lucky things did not turn out worse for him as a shell splinter struck through his helmet.

In 1950 Turek switched to Fortuna Düsseldorf. Between 1950 and 1954 he played 20 games for the West Germany national team. He played in "The Miracle of Bern" 1954 FIFA World Cup final against Hungary and won the Championship.

After a fine save from a very close shot by Nándor Hidegkuti, he was described by the sports reporter Herbert Zimmermann with the words "Toni, you're a football God". He later had to apologize for that comment because the church complained about the comparison of a football player with God.

Death
Turek died in Neuss in 1984. He had been paralyzed from the waist down since August 1973.

Legacy
He has received numerous honours and is still highly regarded in Germany, especially in the Rhineland.

References

Further reading 
Werner Raupp: Toni Turek - "Fußballgott". Eine Biographie, Hildesheim: Arete Verlag 2019 (2018) (ISBN 978-3-96423-008-9).

External links 
 https://www.Toni-Turek.info (Toni-Turek-Archiv, Private archiv of Werner Raupp, Hohenstein/Schwäb. Alb). 
 
 
 

1919 births
1984 deaths
Footballers from Duisburg
People from the Rhine Province
German footballers
Germany international footballers
Association football goalkeepers
SSV Ulm 1846 players
Eintracht Frankfurt players
Fortuna Düsseldorf players
Borussia Mönchengladbach players
FIFA World Cup-winning players
1954 FIFA World Cup players
Recipients of the Knights Cross of the War Merit Cross
German military personnel of World War II
West German footballers
Military personnel from North Rhine-Westphalia